Tom Green Live is a talk show television series hosted by Tom Green that aired weekly on AXS TV from October 2013 to November 2014. This is not to be confused with Green's 2006-2011 web show of the same title, which was later renamed "Tom Green's House Tonight". The show was a one-hour format show with Green interviewing his guest(s).

The following is a complete list of Tom Green Live episodes.

Series overview
{| class="wikitable" style="text-align: center;"
|-
! style="padding: 0 8px;" colspan="2" rowspan="2"| Season
! style="padding: 0 8px;" rowspan="2"| Episodes
! colspan="2"| Originally aired
|-
! style="padding: 0 8px;"| Season premiere
! style="padding: 0 8px;"| Season finale
|-
 |style="background: #B60000;"|
 | 1
 | 7
 | 
 | 
|-
 |style="background: #0038A8;"|
 | 2
 | 13
 | 
 | 
|-
 |style="background: #FFD700;"|
 | 3
 | 24
 | 
 | 
|}

Episodes

Season 1 (2013)

Season 2 (2014)

Season 3 (2014)

External links 
 
 
 

Tom Green Live